Théâtre des Arts may refer to:
 Théâtre Antoine-Simone Berriau, a theatre on Boulevard de Strasbourg in Paris which had the name from 1874 to 1876 and 1879–1881.
 Théâtre des Arts of Rouen, the principal theatre of Opéra Rouen Haute Normandie
 Théâtre Hébertot, a theatre on the Boulevard des Batignolles in Paris which had the name from 1907 to 1940
 Théâtre National (rue de la Loi), a theatre in Paris which had the name from 1794 to 1797 and 1803 to 1804.
 Théâtre Verlaine, a theatre on Rue de Rochechouart in Paris, which had the name from 1953 to 1969.
 Le Théâtre des Arts, a theatre in the Paris Las Vegas Hotel in Paradise, Nevada

Lists of theatres